Frank A. Youmans (May 23, 1860 – April 11, 1932) was a United States district judge of the United States District Court for the Western District of Arkansas.

Education and career

Born on May 23, 1860, near Jefferson City, Missouri, Youmans attended Arkansas Industrial University (now the University of Arkansas) and received a Bachelor of Letters degree in 1884 from the University of Missouri. He entered private practice in Fort Smith, Arkansas from 1886 to 1887. He was the United States Attorney for the Western District of Arkansas from 1887 to 1895. He resumed private practice in Fort Smith from 1896 to 1911.

Federal judicial service

Youmans was nominated by President William Howard Taft on May 29, 1911, to a seat on the United States District Court for the Western District of Arkansas vacated by Judge John Henry Rogers. He was confirmed by the United States Senate on June 20, 1911, and received his commission the same day. His service terminated on April 11, 1932, due to his death.

References

Sources
 

1932 deaths
Judges of the United States District Court for the Western District of Arkansas
United States district court judges appointed by William Howard Taft
20th-century American judges
1860 births
University of Missouri alumni
University of Arkansas alumni